Sana Leibak Manipur (Meitei pronunciation: /sə.ná lə́i.bák mə.ni.pur/; literally, Manipur, Land of Gold) is the official state song of Manipur, India.

History
The lyrics were written in 1965 by B. Jayantakumar Sharma and the music was composed by Aribam Syam Sharma. It had been in use as a de facto state song since 1967 and was officially adopted by the Cabinet of the Government of Manipur in August 2021.

Lyrics
The lyrics are as follows:

See also
List of Indian state songs
Emblem of Manipur

References

External links
Sana Leibak Manipur: vocal rendition with lyrics
Sana Leibak Manipur: instrumental rendition
Sana Leibak Manipur: lyrics

Meitei language
Indian state songs
Meitei-language songs
Symbols of Manipur